Karigaon is a village near Nathaipur in Gyanpur in Sant Ravidas Nagar district in the Indian [[States and 
territories of India|state]] of Uttar Pradesh.

References
 
according to 2011 total
population 4586

Villages in Bhadohi district